The Symphony No. 2 in E minor, Op. 17, is a three-movement orchestral composition written from 1936 to 1937 by the Swedish composer Lars-Erik Larsson. The piece premiered in Stockholm on 24 November 1937 with Larsson conducting the Concert Society Orchestra. In response to unfavorable critical reviews, Larsson immediately withdrew the symphony after its premiere—a fate that, too, had earlier befallen his First (Op. 2, 1928) and would later befall his Third (Op. 34, 1945) symphonies. (Reflecting, in a 1948 interview, on his penchant for self-criticism, Larsson explained that he was more talented at the smaller, less-structured forms and described his symphonies unsympathetically: "In [them] I have said nothing special. Other people have said much better ... [they] belong in my opinion to [my] process of development".) 

Nevertheless, he repurposed the finale as an independent work entitled Ostinato. In this form, the finale was re-premiered on 1 April 1939 at the International Society for Contemporary Music (ISCM) World Music Days in Warsaw and became subsequently one of Larsson's most successful works for orchestra. In 1973, however, the Swedish conductor  successfully revived the complete Symphony No. 2 over Swedish Radio, an event which convinced Larsson that he had been too harsh a critic of his symphonic works and caused him in 1975 to permit a revival the Symphony No. 3.

Structure
The Second Symphony is in three movements. They are as follows:

Although  published Ostinato (Movement IV), Larsson's Symphony No. 2 remains unpublished; apparently, the manuscript is—according to the BIS records liner notes from its 1989 release—under the copyright-collecting auspices of the Swedish Performing Rights Society (STIM).

Recordings
The sortable table below lists commercially available recordings of the Symphony No. 2:

Notes, references, and sources

 
 

Symphonies by Lars-Erik Larsson
20th-century classical music
Classical music in Sweden
1937 compositions